The Iraqi Directorate of General Military Intelligence (DGMI) was the military intelligence service of Iraq from 1932 to 2003.

Its responsibilities included: "1) tactical and strategic reconnaissance of regimes hostile to Iraq; 2) assessing threats of a military nature to Iraq; 3) monitoring the Iraqi military and ensuring the loyalty of the officer corps; 4) maintaining a network of informants in Iraq and abroad, including foreign personnel, and military human intelligence; and 5) protection of military and military-industrial facilities. Al-Istikhbarat is divided into a Special, Political and Administrative Bureau."

It employed embassy personnel, especially the military attaché and his office within the embassy. It had duties inside the army, but it is unknown what these duties were. In 1979 a document called the Strategic Work Plan, by Khalil al-Azzawi, who was head of operations for the Estikhbarat, was leaked. The plan set goals of the overseas branches of the agency, e.g. the military attaché's office in London was told to provide reports of nuclear, chemical and bacteriological installations. Also photos of naval bases and their specifications were required.

In a separate section Ba'ath agents were expected to uncover the structure of NATO forces such as its land, air and sea bases around the world, especially in the Mediterranean Sea.

Several opposition leaders were found dead in Beirut and Paris. Their involvement in the assassinations of Palestinian leaders in 1980 is also likely.

See also
Law enforcement in Iraq
Directorate of General Security - Former internal Iraqi security agency
Iraqi Intelligence Service - Former external Iraqi security agency
Iraqi Special Security Organization - Former security agency responsible for security of VIP's
Iraqi National Intelligence Service - current intelligence agency

Notes

References
Ibrahim Al-Marashi, 'Iraqi intelligence operations and objectives in Turkey, Alternatives, Vol. 2, No.1, Spring 2003

External links
Globalsecurity.org, Iraqi Survey Group final report

Defunct Iraqi intelligence agencies
Military of Iraq
Military intelligence agencies
Organizations disestablished in 2003